This is a list of films made by the British production company Ealing Studios and its predecessor Associated Talking Pictures. Prior to 1932 and after 1956, the company's films were made at studios other than Ealing. This list does not include films made at Ealing Studios by other companies.

1930s

1940s

1950s

See also
 List of Stoll Pictures films
 List of Gainsborough Pictures films
 List of British and Dominions films
 List of British Lion films
 List of British National films
 List of Two Cities Films
 List of General Film Distributors films
 List of Paramount British films

References

Bibliography
 Perry, George. Forever Ealing. Pavilion Books, 1994.

Ealing Studios films
Ealing Studios
Ealing Studios